The Best of Mac Dre 2 is a 2004 two-disc compilation album by hyphy San Francisco Bay Area rapper Mac Dre.

Track listing

Disc 1
Can't No Nigga
Miss You
The Coldest MC
If You
Stupid (Part 1)
Outrages
All It Takes
Feel Me Cuddie
Game 4 Sale
Got Me Crazy
Global
Leevme Alone

Disc 2
Rainin Game
Yes I'm Iz
Oomfoofoo
42 Fake
Punk Police
Mac Dre Boy
Super Humanbeing
Black Buck Rogers
Let's All Get Down
Livin the Life
Ride wit Me
4 Myself (featuring Devious & Dubee)

Mac Dre albums
2004 greatest hits albums
Thizz Entertainment albums
Gangsta rap compilation albums
G-funk compilation albums